Current Allergy and Asthma Reports is a bimonthly peer-reviewed medical journal publishing review articles pertaining to allergy and asthma. It was established in 2001 and is published by Springer Science+Business Media. The editor-in-chief is David Peden (University of North Carolina at Chapel Hill School of Medicine). According to the Journal Citation Reports, the journal has a 2014 impact factor of 2.765.

References

External links

Immunology journals
Springer Science+Business Media academic journals
Review journals
Publications established in 2001
Bimonthly journals
English-language journals